Luca Giordano (18 October 1634 – 3 January 1705) was an Italian late-Baroque painter and printmaker in etching. Fluent and decorative, he worked successfully in Naples and Rome, Florence, and Venice, before spending a decade in Spain.

Early life and training

Born in Naples, Giordano was the son of the painter Antonio Giordano. In around 1650 he was apprenticed to Ribera on the recommendation of the viceroy of Naples and his early work was heavily influenced by his teacher. Like Ribera, he painted many half-length figures of philosophers, either imaginary portraits of specific figures, or generic types.

He acquired the nickname Luca fa presto, which translates into "Luca paints quickly." His speed, in design as well as handiwork, and his versatility, which enabled him to imitate other painters deceptively, earned for him two other epithets, "The Thunderbolt" (Fulmine) and "The Proteus" of painting.

Following a period studying in Rome, Parma and Venice, Giordano developed an elaborate Baroque style fusing Venetian and Roman Influences. His mature work combines the ornamental pomp of Paul Veronese with the lively complex schemes, the "grand manner", of Pietro da Cortona. He is also noted for his lively and showy use of colour.

Florence
In 1682–1683 Giordano painted various fresco series in Florence, including one in the dome of Corsini Chapel of the Chiesa del Carmine. In the large block occupied by the former Medici palace, he painted the ceiling of the Biblioteca Riccardiana (Allegory of Divine Wisdom) and the long gallery of the Palazzo Medici-Riccardi. The vast frescoes of the latter are contained in the 1670s gallery addition, overlooking the gardens. The planning was overseen by Alessandro Segni and commissioned by Francesco Riccardi. They include the prototypic hagiographic celebration of the Medici family in the center, surrounded by a series of interlocking narratives: allegorical figures (the Cardinal Virtues, the Elements of Nature) and mythological episodes (Neptune and Amphitrita, The Rape of Proserpine, The Triumphal procession of Bacchus, The Death of Adonis, Ceres and Triptolemus).

Court painter in Spain (1692–1702)
In 1692 Giordano went to  Spain at the invitation of Charles II. He stayed there for ten years, returning to Naples in 1702, following Charles' death. While in Spain, he painted major decorative schemes at the Buen Retiro Palace, El Escorial, the sacristry of Toledo Cathedral,  The Royal Palace of Aranjuez. The Allegory of the Golden Fleece, a c. 1694 fresco on the ceiling of the Casón del Buen Retiro is one of the possible reasons given for the building having survived when most of the other Buen Retiro palace complex buildings were demolished in the nineteenth century, now it's an annex of the Prado Museum Complex that holds a library for researchers. He also painted part of the frescoes at San Antonio de los Alemanes church and many pictures for the court, private patrons and churches. His pupils, Aniello Rossi  and Matteo Pacelli, assisted him in Spain.

Giordano was popular at the Spanish court, and the king granted him the title of "caballero". His works can be seen all around Madrid, and The Prado houses a large compilation of his works.

Late work in Naples
After his return to Naples early in 1702, Giordano continued to paint prolifically.  Executed in a lighter, less rhetorical style, these late works, prefiguring Rococo, proved influential throughout the eighteenth century, and were admired by Fragonard.

He spent large sums in acts of munificence, and was particularly liberal to poorer artists.  One of his maxims was that the good painter is the one whom the public like, and that the public are attracted more by colour than by design.

Giordano had an astonishing facility, which often lead to an impression of superficiality of his works. He left many works in Rome, and far more in Naples. Of the latter, his Christ expelling the Traders from the Temple in the church of the Padri Girolamini, a colossal work, full of expressive "lazzaroni" or beggars from Naples; also the frescoes of the Triumph of Judith at San 
Martino, and those in the Tesoro della Certosa, including the subject of Moses and the Brazen Serpent; and the cupola paintings in the Church of Santa Brigida. This church contains the artist's own tomb. Other notable examples are the Judgment of Paris in the Berlin Museum, and Christ with the Doctors in the Temple, in the Corsini Gallery of Rome. In later years, he painted influential frescoes for the Cappella Corsini, the Palazzo Medici-Riccardi and other works.
 
Giordano died in Naples in 1705.  Sources differ as to whether he died on 3 January or 12 January 1705.

Influence
His best pupils in painting were Paolo de Matteis and Nicola Malinconico. However, his influence, like his travels and career, were broad and prolific. For example, he is said to have influenced in Venice, Sebastiano Ricci, Giovan Battista Langetti, Giovanni Coli, and Filippo Gherardi. Other pupils included Juan Antonio Boujas, Nunzio Ferraiuoli (Nunzio degli Afflitti), Ansel Fiammingo (il Franceschitto or Francesquitto), Giovanni Battista Lama, Andrea Miglionico, Giuseppe Simonelli, Andrea Vicenti, Andrea Viso, Tommaso Fasano, Tommaso Giaquinto, Domenico di Marino, Pedro de Calabria, Matteo Pacelli, Francisco Tramulles, Nicolo Maria Rossi, Aniello Rossi, and Raimondo de Dominici.

As a young man, Giordano engraved works with considerable skill, including some of his own paintings, such as the Slaughter of the Priests of Baal. He also painted much on the crystal borderings of looking-glasses, cabinets and others seen in many Italian palaces, and was, in this form of art, the master of Pietro Garofalo.

Critical reputation
Giordano has been criticized as being a prolific trader of all styles, and master of none. Michael Levey remarks of him "Giordano was the ideal rococo painter, speedy, prolific, dazzling in colour, assured in draughtsmanship, ever-talented and never touching the fringe of genius." He has been viewed as a proto-Tiepolo, reanimating that grand manner of Cortona in a style that would brighten with Tiepolo.

Gallery
See also :Category:Paintings by Luca Giordano.

References

Additional sources
 
 
 Encyclopædia Britannica 2004 Ultimate Reference Suite DVD
 O. Ferrari - G. Scavizzi, Luca Giordano, Napoli, varie edizioni (1966, 1992, 2000)
 M.Horak, Importanti opera di Luca Giordano a Piacenza, in "Strenna Piacentina 2011" - Amici dell'Arte, Piacenza 2011
 G. Scavizzi - G. De Vito, Luca Giordano giovane 1650-1664, Napoli, 2012
 M. Horak, Luca Giordano: la grande pala in Santa Teresa, in "Panorama Musei", anno XVII, n. 1, 2012

External links

 Scholarly articles in English about Luca Giordano both in web and PDF – the Spanish Old Masters Gallery
 Luca Giordano at Artcyclopedia
 Work of the month – Erminia and the Shepherds – Ducal House of Medinaceli Foundation
 Jusepe de Ribera, 1591–1652, a full text exhibition catalog from The Metropolitan Museum of Art, which includes material on Luca Giordano (see index)

1634 births
1705 deaths
17th-century Neapolitan people
Italian male painters
Italian printmakers
Painters from Naples
Italian Baroque painters
Court painters
17th-century Italian painters
18th-century Italian painters
18th-century Italian male artists